The 2015 Islamabad Local Government Elections were held on November 30 2015. The Pakistan Muslim League (N) (PML(N)) obtained a landslide victory, winning 50 of the 77 seats in the Islamabad Municipal Corporation (IMC), while the Pakistan Tehreek-e-Insaf (PTI) won the remaining 27 seats.There were 676,795 eligible voters. Tight security measures were enforced on polling day. No incidents of violence were reported.

Results

Islamabad Metropolitan Corporation 

Following the election, twelve UC Chairmen who were elected as independents joined the PML(N), while two joined the PTI increasing their numbers to 32 and 18, respectively. After the allocation of reserved seats, the PML(N)‘s number of seats increased to 50 and the PTI’s number of seats increased to 27. Following this, Sheikh Ansar Aziz of the PML(N), who was elected on the reserved technocrat seat, defeated Khurram Shehzad Nawaz of the PTI, who was elected to UC-8 Tumair, to become Islamabad’s first Mayor. Aziz received 49 votes while Nawaz received 26 votes.

References

Local elections in Pakistan
Loc